Mohamed Rasheed (born 4 March 1968) is a swimmer who represented the Maldives at the 1992 Summer Olympics.

Rasheed was 24 years old when he competed at the 1992 Summer Olympics, he entered two swimming events, in the 50 metre freestyle he finished in 72nd place out of 75 starters after swimming in a time of 30.37 seconds, he also competed in the 100 metres freestyle, where he finished his heat in a time of 1:08.12 and in 75th place.

References

External links
 

1968 births
Living people
Maldivian male freestyle swimmers
Olympic swimmers of the Maldives
Swimmers at the 1992 Summer Olympics
Swimmers at the 1994 Asian Games
Asian Games competitors for the Maldives